The 2010 Swedish Open was a tennis tournament played on outdoor clay courts part of the ATP World Tour 250 Series of the 2010 ATP World Tour and 2010 WTA Tour. It took place in Båstad, Sweden, from July 5 through July 11, 2010 for Women's and from July 12 through July 18, 2010 for Men's. It was also known as 2010 Collector Swedish Open for the Women's and 2010 SkiStar Swedish Open for the Men's for sponsorship reasons. It was the 2nd edition for the Women's, while the 63rd for the Men's.

WTA entrants

Players

Seedings are based on the rankings of June 21, 2010.

Other entrants
The following players received wildcards into the singles main draw
  Ellen Allgurin
  Anna Brazhnikova
  Sloane Stephens

The following players received entry from the qualifying draw:
  Nuria Llagostera Vives
  Laura Siegemund
  Ana Vrljić
  Kathrin Wörle

ATP entrants

Seeds

Seedings are based on the rankings of July 5, 2010.

Other entrants
The following players received wildcards into the singles main draw
  Andreas Vinciguerra
  Filip Prpic
  Christian Lindell

The following players received entry from the qualifying draw:
  Jonathan Dasnières de Veigy
  Ervin Eleskovic
  Jerzy Janowicz
  Franko Škugor

Finals

Men's singles

 Nicolás Almagro defeated  Robin Söderling 7–5, 3–6, 6–2
It was Almagro's first title of the year and 6th of his career.

Women's singles

 Aravane Rezaï defeated  Gisela Dulko, 6–3, 4–6, 6–4
It was Rezaï's second title of the year and 4th of her career.

Men's doubles

 Robert Lindstedt /  Horia Tecău defeated  Andreas Seppi /  Simone Vagnozzi, 6–4, 7–5

Women's doubles

 Gisela Dulko /  Flavia Pennetta defeated  Renata Voráčová /  Barbora Záhlavová-Strýcová 7–6(7–0), 6–0

External links
 Official website

Swedish Open
Swedish Open
2010
Swedish Open
July 2010 sports events in Europe